24-Methylenelophenol, or Gramisterol, also called 4α-Methyl-5α-ergosta-7,24(28)-dien-3β-ol is a Metabolic intermediate of sterol biosynthesis of plants and fungis, can be converted from 4α-Methylfecosterol by enzyme HYD1 and converted to (Z)-24-ethylidenelophenol by 24-methylenesterol C-methyltransferase.

References

Sterols